Don Kirkham (February 11, 1908 – March 7, 1998) was an American soil scientist regarded as the founder of mathematical soil physics. His special interest was the flow of water through soils and drainage of agricultural land.  He was awarded the 1983/4 Wolf Prize in Agriculture and the Robert E. Horton Medal in 1995.

Selected publications

References

External links 
 
 
 .
 Don and Betty Kirkham soil physics award and Kirkham conferences, Soil Science Society of America.

1908 births
1998 deaths
American hydrologists
20th-century American physicists
Wolf Prize in Agriculture laureates
Fellows of the American Physical Society